Amy Louise Jackson (born 31 January 1992) is a British actress and model known for her work in Indian films, predominantly in Tamil films, along with a few Hindi and Telugu films. A former Miss Teen World, Jackson has appeared in over fifteen films. She made her US debut in 2017 with Warner Brothers television production of DC Comics Supergirl as Imra Ardeen/ Saturn Girl. Jackson's most notable roles include her debut into the industry as Amy Wilkinson in Madrasapattinam (2010), Sarah in action film Singh Is Bliing (2015), and Nila in India's most expensive film 2.0 (2018).

She has won an Ananda Vikatan Cinema Award, a SIIMA Award, and a London Asian Film Festival award. She was featured in The Times of Indias "Most Desirable Women of 2014" as well as the "Most Promising Female Newcomers of 2012" list.

In 2009, Jackson won the Miss Teen World title in America. At the age of 15, she began her modeling career in the UK and has since worked with designers such as Hugo Boss, Carolina Herrera, JW Anderson, Bvlgari, and Cartier. In a twist of fate, Jackson was called to London to audition for the lead role in the Tamil-language period-drama Madrasapattinam (2010) directed by A. L. Vijay. Despite having had no previous acting experience, Jackson landed the role and thus began her career in India.

Jackson is a patron for charities such as "The Sneha Sargar Orphanage for girls". In 2018, she was honoured with the United Nations' International Day of The Girl Child award in London. Jackson is a proclaimed vegan animal rights advocate and has been an ambassador for PETA since 2016 as well as supporting The Elephant Family with their mission to aid human-animal conflict primarily in Asia.

Early life 
Amy Louise Jackson was born on 31 January 1992 in Douglas on the Isle of Man, the daughter of Marguerita and Alan Jackson,  who divorced several years after Amy Jackson was born. She has an elder sister, Alicia, who is a school teacher. When she was two years old, the family returned to Liverpool and lived with Jackson's grandmother in Woolton so that her father could continue his career with BBC Radio Merseyside. Jackson attended St Edward's College from the age of 3 - 16. She had the intention of taking her A–Levels in English literature, philosophy and ethics before she was cast in her first film.

Career

Modelling 
After winning the Miss Teen Liverpool and Miss Teen Great Britain pageants, Jackson won the title of Miss Teen World in 2009, which resulted in a modelling contract in the US. In 2009, Jackson started her modelling career with the Northern-based modelling agency, Boss Model Management, and then went on to sign with her London agency, Models 1. She won Miss Liverpool in 2010. She competed for the Miss England title in 2010 and was crowned the runner-up to Jessica Linley.

2010–2012: Breakthrough in Indian films 

In 2010, Indian film producers spotted Jackson's photo on the Miss Teen World website and invited her to audition for the Tamil period-drama film Madrasapattinam (2010). Despite having had no previous acting experience, she was cast as the female lead opposite Arya. The film, set against the backdrop of 1947 India, tells the story of a British Governor's daughter who falls in love with a village boy. Jackson admitted that it was very difficult to learn the Tamil dialogues. The film was released on 9 July 2010; it was praised by critics and performed well at the box office, with Jackson gaining praise for her performance. Sify wrote, "It is an out and out Amy Jackson show. She is simply amazing to deliver lines in Tamil, and is one good reason to see the film". Behindwoods wrote, "The one who walks away with the top honours is Amy Jackson for a beautiful portrayal of a lady torn between her love and the mighty empire. She looks absolutely beautiful, emotes well through her expressive eyes and is able to earn the sympathy of the audiences during tough times". Rediff wrote, "Amy Jackson is almost perfect as the wide-eyed young girl who is seeing India for the first time, fascinated by its culture".

In 2011, she was signed by Gautham Vasudev Menon to play the female lead opposite Prateik Babbar in Ekk Deewana Tha (2012), the Hindi remake of the 2010 hit romantic drama film Vinnaithaandi Varuvaayaa. She essayed the role played by Trisha in the original, of Jessie, a Malayali Nasrani Christian who falls in love with a Hindu boy, but is prevented from pursuing the romance by her father. The film was released in February 2012. Jackson received praise for her performance and for her chemistry with Babbar, with BehindWoods stating that "she has done wonders," and the Times of India saying that "she never disappoints."

In September 2012, Jackson made her return to Tamil cinema with a supporting role in Thaandavam (2012), starring opposite Vikram and Anushka Shetty. She was signed for the film in 2011 and shooting took place in India and London, enabling Jackson to return to see her family and friends. It was her second collaboration with director A. L. Vijay after Madrasapattinam (2010). She played the role of Sarah Vinayagam, a British-born Anglo-Indian girl who wins the Miss London title. She reportedly dubbed her own dialogues in Tamil. She received her first nomination for the Filmfare Award for Best Supporting Actress – Tamil at the 60th Filmfare Awards South ceremony.

2014–present 
Jackson made her debut in Telugu cinema with the Vamshi Paidipally's Yevadu (2014) alongside Ram Charan and Shruti Haasan,  playing the role of Shruti. Jackson next starred as supermodel Diya in Shankar's romantic thriller film, whose title is simply I (2015), the biggest project in her career. The making of the film, one of the most costly Indian films to date, took over two-and-a-half years, with a major part of the film being shot in China. The film was released on 14 January 2015 and received a mixed critical response, although Jackson's performance received favorable reviews. Deccan Chronicle wrote that she was "simply superb. She is another highlight of the film and has given a mature performance", while Sify noted that she was "the biggest surprise packet in the film" and "perfect eye candy". Consequently, she was ranked #1 in The Times of India, Chennai Edition list of the most desirable women in 2014.
After I (2015), Jackson signed on to Prabhu Deva's Singh Is Bliing (2015), opposite Akshay Kumar. She had signed on to be part of Venkat Prabhu's supernatural thriller Masss (2015), but opted out of it later when the script and her character were changed. Instead, she signed on to Velraj's Thanga Magan (2015) alongside Dhanush and Samantha Ruth Prabhu.

Soon after, Jackson starred in Thirukumaran's Gethu (2016), portraying an Anglo-Indian girl, for which she won positive reviews, . She has been shooting for a "gritty BBC drama series", on which she declined to further elaborate. She then portrayed the lead female role in Atlee's Theri (2016), featured alongside Vijay while portraying a Malayali teacher. Her performance received positive reviews and her role as a teacher was well appreciated. Upon release, the film went on to become one of the most profitable Tamil films of all time.

On 25 September 2017, it was announced that Jackson had been cast in her first Hollywood role as Imra Ardeen, aka Saturn Girl, in The CW's superhero drama series Supergirl (2017). The character made her first appearance in the third season. The series, based on DC characters created by Jerry Siegel and Joe Shuster, is produced by Berlanti Productions in association with Warner Bros Television.

Jackson has played Sita in Prem's Kannada film The Villain (2018) alongside Shiva Rajkumar and Sudeep. She starred as the andro-humanoid robot Nila in Shankar's film 2.0 (2018) alongside Rajinikanth and Akshay Kumar. After a four-year hiatus, Jackson returned to film with Acham Enbathu Illayae.

Personal life 
Jackson lived in India from 2012 to 2015 in Mumbai, Maharashtra, before later moving back to England, currently living in London. Jackson revealed that she was dating hotelier George Panayiotou, the son of English-Cypriot businessman Andreas Panayiotou since December 2015.  On 1 January 2019, George Panayiotou proposed in Zambia. Their son was born on 19 September 2019. The couple later broke up. In 2022, she started dating Ed Westwick.

Jackson is a regular attendee at BAFTA, Cannes Film Festival, British Fashion Awards and International Fashion Weeks. In 2017 she was chosen as the muse for L'Agence at The Green Carpet Fashion Awards during Milan Fashion Week. She has been featured in editorials for fashion magazines like Vogue, Marie Clare, Cosmopolitan, ELLE.

Jackson is an ambassador and spokesperson for charities such as Being Human, Cash and Rocket St. Jude's Hospital in Mumbai and the Girl Child education program in India. In 2014, she posed with her rescue cat in a PETA campaign promoting the adoption of animals from shelters.

Filmography

Awards and nominations 
 2013: The Times of India's Most Desirable Women of 2012 #22
 2013: The Times of India's Most Promising Female Newcomer 2012: #7 (for Ekk Deewana Tha)

References

External links 

 
 
 

1992 births
Living people
People from Douglas, Isle of Man
English beauty pageant winners
English female models
English film actresses
English television actresses
Actresses from Liverpool
Manx people
Manx emigrants
English Christians
English expatriates in India
British expatriate actresses in India
British veganism activists
European actresses in India
Actresses of European descent in Indian films
Actresses in Hindi cinema
Actresses in Tamil cinema
Actresses in Telugu cinema
Actresses in Kannada cinema
21st-century English women
21st-century English people
21st-century British actresses
21st-century Manx actresses